Itzamnaaj Bʼalam II was a Mayan king who ruled in Yaxchilan. Experts usually date his reign between the end of the 6th century and the beginning of the 7th century, around 599 or even until around 610. Very little is known of him. He is also called Shield Jaguar by modern writers, based on the name glyph before the phonetic name was deciphered.

References

Bibliography
 
 
 

Rulers of Yaxchilan
Medieval kings